Taeniopterygidae are a family of stone flies with about 110 described extant species. They are commonly called willowflies or winter stoneflies and have a holarctic distribution. Adults are usually smaller than 15 mm.

Genera
These 21 genera belong to the family Taeniopterygidae. The genus Taeniopteryx is in the subfamily Taeniopteryginae, and the remainder of the extant genera are in the subfamily Brachypterainae.

 Bolotoperla Ricker & Ross, 1975
 Brachyptera Newport, 1848
 Doddsia Needham & Claassen, 1925
 Kohnoperla Ricker & Ross, 1975
 Kyphopteryx Kimmins, 1947
 Mesyatsia Ricker & Ross, 1975
 Obipteryx Okamoto, 1922
 Oemopteryx Klapálek, 1902
 Okamotoperla Ricker & Ross, 1975
 Rhabdiopteryx Klapálek, 1902
 Strophopteryx Frison, 1929
 Taenionema Banks, 1905
 Taeniopteryx Pictet, 1841

Extinct genera 

 † Balticopteryx Chen, 2018 (1 species) Baltic amber, Eocene
 † Gurvanopteryx Sinitshenkova, 1986  (2 species) Gurvan-Eren Formation, Mongolia, Early Cretaceous (Aptian)
 † Jurataenionema Liu & Ren, 2007 (3 species) Daohugou, China, Middle/Late Jurassic Khasurty, Russia, Early Cretaceous (Aptian)
 † Liaotaenionema Liu, Ren & Sinitshenkova, 2008 (1 species) Yixian Formation, China, Early Cretaceous (Aptian)
 † Mengitaenioptera Liu & Ren, 2008 (1 species) Daohugou, China, Middle/Late Jurassic 
 † Noviramonemoura Liu & Ren, 2008 (1 species) Daohugou, China, Middle/Late Jurassic
 † Positopteryx Sinitshenkova, 1987 (1 species) Glushkovo Formation, Russia, Late Jurassic (Tithonian)
 † Protaenionema Liu & Shih, 2007 (1 species) Daohugou, China, Middle/Late Jurassic

References

Further reading

 Zhiltzova, L.A. (2006). A review of stoneflies of the family Taeniopterygidae (Plecoptera) in Russia and adjacent countries. Entomological Review 86(6):632-634. 
 

 
Plecoptera families